The canton of Roussillon is an administrative division of the Isère department, eastern France. Its borders were modified at the French canton reorganisation which came into effect in March 2015. Its seat is in Roussillon.

It consists of the following communes:
 
Agnin
Anjou
Beaurepaire
Bellegarde-Poussieu
Bougé-Chambalud
Chalon
Chanas
La Chapelle-de-Surieu
Cour-et-Buis
Jarcieu
Moissieu-sur-Dolon
Monsteroux-Milieu
Montseveroux
Pact
Le Péage-de-Roussillon
Pisieu
Pommier-de-Beaurepaire
Primarette
Revel-Tourdan
Roussillon
Sablons
Saint-Barthélemy
Saint-Julien-de-l'Herms
Saint-Romain-de-Surieu
Salaise-sur-Sanne
Sonnay
Ville-sous-Anjou

References

Cantons of Isère